Greenwood is a populated place situated in Mohave County, Arizona, United States.

References

External links
 Greenwood City – ghosttowns.com

Populated places in Mohave County, Arizona
Ghost towns in Arizona